My Wife's Murder is a 2005 Indian Hindi-language thriller film directed by Jijy Philip. The cast includes Anil Kapoor, Suchitra Krishnamurti, Boman Irani and Nandana Sen. The film is a remake of  Telugu film, Madhyanam Hathya, directed by Ram Gopal Varma himself. The movie seems to closely follow the story of Horace William Manton, the main accused in the Luton Sack Murder Case.

Plot 
Police Inspector Tejpal Randhawa (Boman Irani) is assigned to investigate the case of the dead woman whose body is recovered from a small pond. Insp. Tejpal checks if this matter can be linked with a missing person's report filed by Ravi Patwardhan (Anil Kapoor) and his father-in-law. The dead woman is identified as Sheela (Suchitra Krishnamoorthy), Ravi's wife. According to Ravi, Sheela had left their home to go to visit Shirdi along with her parents. When Ravi is informed by his father-in-law that she had not arrived at their house at all despite 24 hours after her departure, they take the matter seriously and Ravi accompanied his father-in-law go to the nearest police station and file a report that she is missing. Insp. Tejpal concludes that Sheela was waylaid on her way to her parents' house by person(s) unknown, beaten, and her body was left in the pond. But this case puzzles him, as there was no apparent motive for unknown person(s) to waylay her, as no money was taken and her body did not show any sign of sexual molestation. Taking these facts into consideration, Insp. Tejpal starts to disbelieve and suspect Ravi. Ravi's assistant Reena,(Nandana Sen) tries to help Ravi. However, her involvement makes the matter worse for her and her boy-friend Raj, (Rajesh Kapoor), who suspects her to have a relation with her boss Ravi. The movie then takes the audience through a thrilling tale of how Tejpal chases down the fleeing Ravi and ultimately ascertains the truth behind Sheela's murder.

Cast 
 Anil Kapoor as Ravi Patwardhan: He is a man whose wife is murdered and he has to make it out of the matter proving himself innocent.
 Suchitra Krishnamoorthy as Sheela Patwardhan: Ravi's wife who gets murdered.
 Boman Irani as Inspector Tejpal Randhawa: He investigates the case of Sheela's murder.
 Nandana Sen: Reena Wadhwa, Ravi's assistant who tries to help Ravi, however, unwillingly gets too much involved making the matter worse for her, her boyfriend and their relationship.
 Rajesh Tandon as Raj, Reena's boyfriend.
 Abhijeet Lahiri as Sheela's father
 Dr Manjali as Sheela's mother
 Manish Khanna as Wagle, Tejpal's assistant in the murder case.
 Abhay Bhargava as Tapan Banerjee
 Meenakshi Verma as Tejpal's wife.
 Geetanjali Rao as Ravi's maidservant.
 Shankar Sachdeva as Singh.
 Lalit Parashar as Hotel owner.
 Aloke Shukla as bus conductor.
 Master Zain Khan as Karan Patwardhan, Ravi's son.
 Baby Maariyah Khatri as Minni Patwardhan, Ravi's daughter.

Music
Kuch Lamhe Ki Bas - Ghulam Ali, composer: M. M. Kreem

References

External links

Films scored by M. M. Keeravani
2005 films
2000s Hindi-language films
2005 thriller films
Hindi remakes of Telugu films
Indian thriller films
Hindi-language thriller films